Thomas Austin Pereira (12 June 1973) is a retired Norwegian footballer who is currently the manager of Viking 2. He spent most of his career at Viking FK in Eliteserien, playing a total of 433 official matches for the club.

Club career
He played several seasons for Sarpsborg FK. In 1994 he spent time on loan at Aalborg Chang while also attending the folk high school .

Thomas Pereira arrived at Viking from Moss in 1997, and stayed at the club the rest of his career. At the end of the 2008 season, he was ranked 7th on Viking's all-time list of appearances. On October 10, 2008, he signed a new one-year contract with Viking, stating that it could never be another club. After his thirteenth and last season in Viking he was awarded a testimonial game that was played on 21 November 2009 against SK Brann. Testimonial games are very rare in Norwegian football.

International career
He made his international debut against South Korea in 1997, and has a total of 8 senior international caps.

Coaching career
After his retirement, he was hired as head coach of Randaberg, but after one season he came back to Viking to work as physical coach.

Pereira became the manager of Viking FK's reserve team, Viking 2, in 2016.

Personal life
His father was born in Goa but was raised in Uganda while his mother is Norwegian.

In 2017 his son Adrian Pereira made his debut for Viking FK's senior team aged 17. Adrian is currently playing as a left-back for Greek club PAOK.

References

1973 births
Living people
People from Sarpsborg
Norwegian people of Ugandan descent
Norwegian people of Indian descent
Norwegian people of Goan descent
Norwegian footballers
Sarpsborg FK players
Aalborg Chang players
Moss FK players
Viking FK players
Eliteserien players
Norwegian First Division players
Norway international footballers
Association football defenders
Norwegian expatriate footballers
Expatriate men's footballers in Denmark
Norwegian expatriate sportspeople in Denmark
Viking FK non-playing staff
Sportspeople from Viken (county)